Pipiolos (Spanish for a young or naive person) was a name used to refer to Chilean upper class liberals in the early 19th century. The name "pipiolo" was originally used by the conservative Pelucones in a derogatory manner by associating the liberals to inexperience. In the Chilean Civil War of 1829 the Pipiolos, led by Ramón Freire, were defeated and the Pelucones could triumphantly enforce the Chilean Constitution of 1833, which led to creation of a strong unitarian and authoritarian presidentialist system held up by upper-class democracy.

During the Revolution of 1851, the Pipiolos made a failed attempt to seize power from conservatives. With the Liberal–Conservative Fusion in 1858, the term "Pipiolo" fell into disuse.

Historical leaders
 Ramón Freire
 Francisco Antonio Pinto
 Jorge Beauchef
 Francisco de la Lastra
 José Manuel Borgoño
 Guillermo Tupper
 José Rondizzoni
 Enrique Castro
 Francisco Ramón Vicuña 

Liberalism in Chile